Costus claviger is a species of flowering plant from the genus Costus.

Description
Costus claviger is a rhizomatous geophyte and grows primarily in the wet tropical biome.

Distribution
Costus claviger is native to: French Guiana, Guyana and Suriname. It preferes to grow on a granitic substrate, i.e. in soil that contains granite.

References

Flora of French Guiana
Flora of Guyana
Flora of Suriname
claviger